The ochre-flanked tapaculo (Eugralla paradoxa) is a species of bird in the family Rhinocryptidae. It is found in south-central Chile and adjacent western Argentina.

Taxonomy and systematics

The ochre-flanked tapaculo is the only member of the genus Eugralla and has no subspecies. It had at one time been assigned to genus Triptohinus but Eugralla has priority.

Description

The adults' upper parts are dark gray, the underparts as far as the abdomen paler gray, and the abdomen and vent are clay brown. The flanks are tawny brown The juvenile is barred throughout with cinnamon to rufous over dusky gray. Unusual for a tapaculo, it has a "Roman nose" facial profile.

Distribution and habitat

The ochre-flanked tapaculo is a year round resident of south-central Chile (Maule Region to Los Lagos Region) and the western parts of the adjoining Argentinian provinces of Neuquén, Río Negro, and Chubut.

Behavior

Feeding

The ochre-flanked tapaculo forages in pairs on and near the ground in dense cover. Its primary prey is thought to be arthropods.

Breeding

The ochre-flanked tapaculo is known to "double brood", laying eggs in September and again in November. Nests have been found in thick bushes, small trees, and piles of branches.

Vocalization

The ochre-flanked tapaculo's song is a short series of sharp "check" notes . The members of a pair keep in contact with a softer "kek" call .

Status

The IUCN has assessed the ochre-flanked tapaculo as being of Least Concern. It has a fairly large range and is common in the southern part of it. It inhabits several protected areas in Chile. However, the population's number is unknown and is believed to be slowly decreasing.

References

External links
Image at ADW

ochre-flanked tapaculo
Birds of Chile
Birds of Argentina
ochre-flanked tapaculo
Taxa named by Heinrich von Kittlitz
Taxonomy articles created by Polbot
Fauna of the Valdivian temperate rainforest